The 1979 Montreal Expos season was the 11th in franchise history. The team finished second in the National League East with a record of 95-65, 2 games behind the first-place Pittsburgh Pirates. The 1979 season was the Expos first winning season in franchise history (and it would be the most wins they would have in a season in the team's history before they relocated).

Offseason 
 November 28, 1978: Duffy Dyer was signed as a free agent by the Expos.
 December 4, 1978: Ken Macha was drafted by the Expos from the Pittsburgh Pirates in the 1978 rule 5 draft.
 December 7, 1978: Stan Papi was traded by the Expos to the Boston Red Sox for Bill Lee.
 December 8, 1978: Mike Hart was traded by the Expos to the Texas Rangers for Jim Mason.
 December 9, 1978: Randy St. Claire was signed by the Expos as an amateur free agent.
 December 14, 1978: Sam Mejías was traded by the Expos to the Chicago Cubs for Jerry White and Rodney Scott.
 March 30, 1979: Mike Garman was released by the Expos.
 March 31, 1979: Pepe Frías was traded by the Expos to the Atlanta Braves for Dave Campbell.

Spring training
The Expos held spring training at City Island Ball Park in Daytona Beach, Florida. It was their seventh season there.

Regular season

Season standings

Record vs. opponents

Opening Day lineup 
 Andre Dawson, CF
 Rodney Scott, 2B
 Warren Cromartie, LF
 Ellis Valentine, RF
 Tony Pérez, 1B
 Gary Carter, C
 Larry Parrish, 3B
 Chris Speier, SS
 Steve Rogers, P

Notable transactions 
 June 13, 1979: The Expos traded a player to be named later and cash to the San Francisco Giants for John Tamargo. The Expos completed the deal by sending Joe Pettini to the Giants on March 15, 1980.
 July 20, 1979: The Expos traded a player to be named later and cash to the Detroit Tigers for Rusty Staub. The Expos completed the deal by sending Randy Schafer (minors) to the Tigers on December 3.

Youppi! 
Youppi!, a creation of Acme Mascots, Inc. (a division of Harrison/Erickson, Inc.), was commissioned by Expos vice-president Roger D. Landry. Originally leased by the team in 1979, the mascot was eventually purchased by the Expos and represented the team.

Roster

Game log 

|-
| Legend:       = Win       = Loss       = PostponementBold = Expos team member'

 Player stats 

 Batting 

 Starters by position Note: Pos = Position; G = Games played; AB = At bats; H = Hits; Avg. = Batting average; HR = Home runs; RBI = Runs batted in Other batters Note: G = Games played; AB = At bats; H = Hits; Avg. = Batting average; HR = Home runs; RBI = Runs batted in Pitching 

 Starting pitchers Note: G = Games pitched; IP = Innings pitched; W = Wins; L = Losses; ERA = Earned run average; SO = Strikeouts Other pitchers Note: G = Games pitched; IP = Innings pitched; W = Wins; L = Losses; ERA = Earned run average; SO = Strikeouts Relief pitchers Note: G = Games pitched; W = Wins; L = Losses; SV = Saves; ERA = Earned run average; SO = Strikeouts Awards and honors 
 Dick Williams, Associated Press NL Manager of the Year

 All-Stars 
1979 Major League Baseball All-Star Game

 Farm system 

 Notes 

 References 

 1979 Montreal Expos at Baseball Reference 1979 Montreal Expos at Baseball Almanac''

Montreal Expos seasons
Montreal Expos season
1970s in Montreal
1979 in Quebec